Liometopum is a genus of ants that belongs to the subfamily Dolichoderinae, found in North America, Europe and Asia.

Caterpillars of certain butterfly species have a symbiotic relationship with Liometopum ants. They produce secretions that the ants will feed on, similar to the behavior of the ant genus Iridomyrmex.

Species

Liometopum apiculatum Mayr, 1870
†Liometopum bogdassarovi (Nazaraw, Bagdasaraw & Uriew, 1994)
†Liometopum brunascens (Heer, 1867)
†Liometopum crassinervis Heer, 1849
†Liometopum croaticum (Heer, 1849)
†Liometopum eremicum Zhang, 1989
†Liometopum escheri (Heer, 1867)
†Liometopum globosum (Heer, 1849)
†Liometopum imhoffii (Heer, 1849)
†Liometopum incognitum Dlussky, Rasnitsyn, & Perfilieva, 2015 
Liometopum lindgreeni Forel, 1902
†Liometopum longaevum (Heer, 1849)
†Liometopum lubricum Zhang, Sun & Zhang, 1994
Liometopum luctuosum Wheeler, 1905 – the pine tree ant
Liometopum masonium (Buckley, 1866)
Liometopum microcephalum (Panzer, 1798)
†Liometopum miocenicum Carpenter, 1930
Liometopum occidentale Emery, 1895 – the velvety tree ant
†Liometopum oligocenicum Wheeler, 1915
Liometopum orientale Karavaiev, 1927
†Liometopum pallidum (Heer, 1867)
†Liometopum potamophilum Zhang, 1989
†Liometopum rhenana (Meunier, 1917)
†Liometopum scudderi Carpenter, 1930
Liometopum sinense Wheeler, 1921
†Liometopum stygium (Heer, 1867)
†Liometopum venerarium (Heer, 1864)
†Liometopum ventrosum (Heer, 1849)

See also
Escamoles, a Mexican dish made from Liometopum larvae and pupae

References

External links

Dolichoderinae
Ant genera
Taxa named by Gustav Mayr